The 1860 United States presidential election in Mississippi took place on November 6, 1860, as part of the 1860 United States presidential election. Mississippi voters chose seven representatives, or electors, to the Electoral College, who voted for president and vice president.

Mississippi was won by the 14th Vice President of the United States John C. Breckinridge (SD–Kentucky), running with Senator Joseph Lane, with 59.00% of the popular vote, against Senator John Bell (CU–Tennessee), running with the 15th Governor of Massachusetts Edward Everett, with 36.25% of the popular vote.

The Republican Party candidate Abraham Lincoln was not on the ballot in the state.

Results

References

Mississippi
1860
1860 Mississippi elections